Oval with Points is a series of enigmatic abstract sculptures by British sculptor Henry Moore, made in plaster and bronze from 1968 to 1970, from a  maquette in 1968 (LH 594) made in plaster and then cast in bronze, through a  working model in 1968–1969 (LH 595) also made plaster and then cast in bronze, to a full-size  bronze version cast in 1969 (LH 596).

Description
The sculpture is a flattened oval ring with rounded edges, pierced by a large hole.  The inside edge of the hole has two protrusions rising from opposite sides and narrowing to sharp points that almost meet at the centre of the hole, creating a sense of energy and dynamic tension.  The points divide the hole into two areas, a smaller one above and a larger one below, like a figure 8, with the shape of the void sometimes interpreted as resembling a human form with a head and a torso.

The beginnings of the sculpture can be traced in Moore's works back to a sculpture made in 1939–40, Three Points, and some drawings from 1940.  Moore was often inspired by found natural objects, such as stone with a hole.  The work may draw inspiration from an elephant skull collected in East Africa by Sir Julian Huxley and displayed in his garden, and later given to Moore as a gift.  Oval with Points is also related to other Moore sculptures, included his Spindle Piece and Two Piece Points: Skull, both of which have two points facing outwards rather than inwards.  Moore himself later mentioned a link in his mind to spark plugs.

Moore made a plaster maquette of Oval with Points (LH 594) in 1968, which was then cast in bronze in an edition of 9+1 (nine castings plus an artist's copy).  It measures .  The plaster maquette and the bronze artist's copy, cast 0, are held by the Henry Moore Foundation in Perry Green, Hertfordshire.  Another example is at the Art Gallery of Ontario.

The sculpture was originally modelled in plaster, which is now held at the Henry Moore Sculpture Centre at the Art Gallery of Ontario. This was cast in an edition of 12+2 bronzes (i.e. two artist's copies, and 12 other casts). These two artist's copies are now held by the Henry Moore Foundation, along with two plaster casts of this working model. Other bronze casts are owned by the Museum of Modern Art in New York (not currently on view), the San Francisco Museum of Modern Art (not currently on view) and the University of California, Los Angeles (currently on display in the UCLA School of Medicine building).

It was cast in an edition of 6+1 (six plus one artist's model) 1 by Morris Singer. Examples of the full size work are displayed at:
 the Henry Moore Foundation, in Perry Green, Hertfordshire (cast 0)
 the centre of a fountain in Exchange Square in Hong Kong (cast 3)
 across from Dorrian Commons Park in Columbus, Ohio (cast 2 or 4)
 the Corniche Road in Jeddah (cast5) (acquired in 1977, along with a cast of Large Spindle Piece and Three Piece Reclining Figure No .1) )
 outside the Kunsthalle Bielefeld (cast 6)

See also

List of sculptures by Henry Moore

References

External links

 Celebrating Moore: Works from the Collection of the Henry Moore Foundation, p. 293
 Maquette (LH 594)
 Plaster maquette, cast a, Henry Moore Foundation
 Bronze maquette, cast 0, Henry Moore Foundation
 Working model (LH 595)
 Plaster working model, cast a, Henry Moore Foundation
 Plaster working model, cast b, Henry Moore Foundation
 Bronze working model, cast 0, Henry Moore Foundation
 Bronze working model, cast 00, Henry Moore Foundation
 Museum of Modern Art, New York
 San Francisco Museum of Modern Art
 Full size (LH 596)
 Cast 0, Henry Moore Foundation
 Cast 1, Princeton
 Princeton University Art Museum
 Cast 3, Hong Kong
 Cast 5, Jeddah
 Jeddah Sculpture Museum
 Cast 6, Kunsthalle Bielefeld
 Oval with Points Kunsthalle Bielefeld, cast 6, Henry Moore Foundation

Abstract sculptures in the United States
Bronze sculptures in Ohio
Downtown Columbus, Ohio
Outdoor sculptures in Columbus, Ohio
Sculptures by Henry Moore